Claudius Marie "C.M." Offray, the founder of C.M. Offray and Sons, Inc., was a French-born American designer and manufacturer of ribbons during the late 19th and early 20th centuries. Offray came to the United States from the ribbon-center of France, Saint-Etienne near Lyons, and founded his company in 1876.  As of 1988, Offray & Son Inc. was the largest manufacturer of ribbon in the world. The business was merged in 2002 with competitor Berwick Industries to create the name "Berwick Offray".

Offray & Sons Inc. was chosen four times— in 1980, 1984, 1988, and 1996— to provide the ribbons used by medal winners in the Olympic Games.

References

 American industrialists
French emigrants to the United States
Year of birth missing
American company founders
Place of death missing
Year of death missing
19th-century American businesspeople